Máeleoin Bódur Ó Maolconaire was a member of the Ó Maolconaire family of Connacht, who served as historians and poets to the Síol Muireadaigh, and their rulers, the Ó Conchubhair Kings of Connacht. He is the second of the family listed as the Ollamh Síol Muireadaigh, and died in 1266.

Sources

The Encyclopaedia of Ireland 2003; .
 Mac Dermot of Moylurg: The Story of a Connacht Family Dermot Mac Dermot, 1996.
A New History of Ireland VIII: A Chronology of Irish History to 1976 - A Companion to Irish History Part I edited by T.W. Moody, F.X. Martin and F.J. Byrne, 1982. 
The Celebrated Antiquary Nollaig O Muralie, Maynooth, 1996. 
Irish Leaders and Learning Through the Ages Fr. Paul Walsh, 2004. (ed. Nollaig O Muralie).

External links
List of Published Texts at CELT — University College Cork's Corpus of Electronic Texts

13th-century births
1266 deaths
13th-century Irish historians
People from County Roscommon
13th-century Irish poets
Irish male poets